Sergei Igorevich Kovalyov (born 22 September 1965 in Krasnodar) is a former Russian football player.

References

1965 births
Sportspeople from Krasnodar
Living people
Soviet footballers
FC Chernomorets Novorossiysk players
FC Kuban Krasnodar players
FK Neftchi Farg'ona players
FC Aktobe players
Russian footballers
FC KAMAZ Naberezhnye Chelny players
Russian Premier League players
Association football midfielders
FC Neftekhimik Nizhnekamsk players
FC Dynamo Vologda players